Sikh music, also known as Gurbani Sangeet (Gurmukhi: ਗੁਰਬਾਣੀ ਸੰਗੀਤ; meaning music of the speech of wisdom), and as Gurmat Sangeet (Gurmukhi: ਗੁਰਮਤਿ ਸੰਗੀਤ; meaning music of the counsel or tenets of the Guru), or even as Shabad Kirtan (ਸ਼ਬਦ ਕੀਰਤਨ), is the classical music style that is practised within Sikhism. It exists in institutional, popular, and folk traditions, forms, and varieties. Three types of Sikh musicians are rababis, ragis, and dhadhis.

History 
Musical expression has held a very important place within the Sikh tradition ever since its beginning, with Guru Nanak and his faithful companion, Bhai Mardana. Mardana was a player of the rabab, and would travel alongside Nanak and play the instrument when Nanak spoke his teachings. As a result of this, Mardana is credited as establishing the rababi tradition in Sikhism.

Musical Fundamentals

Raag 

A raga or raag (Punjabi: ਰਾਗ  رَاگَ (Shahmukhi)) is a complex structure of musical melody used in Indian classical music. It is a set of rules of how to build a melody which can ignite a certain mood in the reciter and listeners. The Sikh holy scripture, Guru Granth Sahib Ji, is composed in and divided into a total of 60 ragas. This is a combination of 31 single raags  and 29 mixed (or mishrit; ਮਿਸ਼ਰਤ) raags (a raag composed by combining two or three raags together). Each raga is a chapter or section in the Guru Granth Sahib starting with Asaa raag, and all the hymns produced in Asaa raag are found in this section ordered chronologically by the Guru or other Bhagat that have written hymns in that raga. All raags in the Guru Granth Sahib Ji are named raag.

Following is the list of all sixty raags (including 39 main raags and 21 mishrit [mixed] raags, including Deccani ones) under which Gurbani is written, in order of appearance with page numbers. The name of raags ending with the word Dakhani (English: Deccani) are not mishrit raags because Dakhani is not a raag per se; it simply means 'in south Indian style'.

Raags are used in Sikh music simply to create a mood, and are not restricted to particular times. A mood can be created by the music of the raag regardless of the time of day. There are a total of 60 raags or melodies within the Guru Granth Sahib. Each melody sets a particular mood for the hymn, adding a deeper dimension to it. The Guru Granth Sahib is thought by many to have just 31 raags or melodies which is correct of single raags. However, combined with mishrit raags, that total is 60.

Ghar 

The table below covers the seventeen Ghars found in the primary Sikh scripture (Guru Granth Sahib):

Taal 

Taals have a vocalised and therefore recordable form wherein individual beats are expressed as phonetic representations of various strokes played upon the tabla. Various Ghars (literally 'Houses' which can be inferred to be "styles" – basically styles of the same art with cultivated traditional variances) also have their own preferences.

Instruments

Sikhs have historically used a variety of instruments (Gurmukhi: ਸਾਜ Sāja) to play & sing the Gurbani in the specified Raag. The Sikh Gurus specifically promoted the stringed instruments for playing their compositions. Colonization of the Indian Subcontinent by the British Empire caused the use of traditional instruments (ਤੰਤੀ ਸਾਜ; tanti sāja meaning "stringed instruments") to die down in favor of foreign instruments like the harmonium (vaaja; ਵਾਜਾ). There is now a revival among the Sikh community to bring native, Guru-designated instruments back into the sphere of Sikh music to play Gurbani in the specified Raag. Organizations like Raj Academy & Nad Music Institute are among the many online teaching services available. These instruments include:

Traditional

String 
Stringed instruments, known as Tat vad, are as follows:
Rabab (ਰਬਾਬ; Rabāba): Gifted by Bebe Nanaki and played by Bhai Mardana on his travels accompanying Guru Nanak. The Sikh rabab was traditionally a local Punjabi variant of the North Indian seni rabab known as the 'Firandia' rabab (Punjabi: ਫਿਰੰਦੀਆ ਰਬਾਬ Phiradī'ā rabāba), however Baldeep Singh, an expert in the Sikh musical tradition, challenges this narrative.
Saranda (ਸਰੰਦਾ; Saradā): created and played by Guru Arjan Dev
Sarangi (ਸਾਰੰਗੀ; Sāragī: meaning "a hundred colours"): promoted by Guru Hargobind to establish the Dhadi Jatha tradition at Akal Takht Sahib. Also associated with Guru Har Rai.
Taus (ਤਾਊਸ; Tā'ūsa: meaning "peacock" in Persian): 
Dilruba (ਦਿਲਰੁਬਾ; Dilarubā: meaning "Heart-thief" in Persian): created and played by Guru Gobind Singh when his soldiers asked him for a smaller, more portable version of the Taus
Israj (ਇਸਰਾਜ; Isarāja): smaller version of Dilruba
Surmandal
Sitar
Tambura (ਤੰਬੂਰਾ/ਤਾਨਪੁਰਾ; Tabūrā/Tānapurā)

Percussion 
Percussion instruments, known as Avanad vad, are:
Jori (ਜੋੜੀ; Jōṛī): creation traditionally attributed to Satta and Balwand in the court of Guru Arjan Sahib by splitting the Mardang into two individual instruments
Pakhawaj (ਪਖਾਵਜ; Pakhāvaja)
The Nagara drum is also required in every Gurdwara according to the Sikh Rehat Maryada.

Wind 
Wind instruments, known as Sushir vad, are:
Bansuri (ਬੰਸਰੀ; Basarī meaning "Indian flute")

Idiophones 
Idiophone instruments, known as Ghan vad, are also commonly used, especially in folk forms of Sikh music.

Contemporary 
Vaaja (ਵਾਜਾ; Vājā: native word for 'harmonium'): introduced by Europeans and massively adopted and popularized by the Sikhs in the 19th and 20th centuries, ultimately supplanting native instruments of the region
Tabla (ਤਬਲਾ; Tabalā): supplanted earlier jori and pakhawaj

See also

References

External links
 The 31 Raags of Sri Guru Granth Sahib
 raag-melodies

Ragas in the Guru Granth Sahib
Sikh practices